James Macgregor (1 August 1808 – 5 September 1858) was a British banker, railway chairman and politician.

Early life
James Macgregor, Esq. (sometimes spelled Mac Gregor or M'Gregor) was born in Liverpool, England on 1 August 1808, the son of Alexander Macgregor, Esq. of Bloomhill in Manchester, England.

Business career
James Macgregor began his business career as a banker in Liverpool, serving as the manager of Liverpool Commercial Banking Company.   In September 1845 Macgregor was elected chairman and managing director of South Eastern Railway.  The position gave Macgregor full autonomy over the railway's operations.  After nine challenging years dealing with the line's expansion and acrimonious relations with other railways, Macgregor resigned in 1854.

In addition to his private business responsibilities, Macgregor served as M.P. for Sandwich, England beginning in 1852 until his defeat in 1857.

Family
James Macgregor was firstly married on 3 November 1829 at St Marylebone Parish Church to Jane Small, eldest daughter of London merchant, Robert Small, Esq. of York Terrace, Regent's Park, London.  Jane and her father were members of the Smalls of Dirnanean, Perthshire, Scotland.  The couple had nine children before Jane Small's death in 1845.

Macgregor secondly married Catherine Pendarvis Lochner at St Mary on Paddington Green Church on 11 August 1849, and with her had an additional five children, including Lt.-Col. James Pendarvis Macgregor.

A grandson was John Cecil Currie  (1898 – 26 June 1944).

James Macgregor died in London on 5 September 1858, aged 50.

See also
George Forrester and Company

References

External links
 Hansard 1803-2005 Contributions in Parliament by James Macgregor
 

|-

1808 births
1858 deaths
English bankers
British railway entrepreneurs
Businesspeople from Liverpool
UK MPs 1852–1857
Members of the Parliament of the United Kingdom for English constituencies
19th-century English businesspeople